Anna J. Foerster (born 1971) is a German-born American film and television cinematographer and director. She is best known for collaborations with director Roland Emmerich, working under different capacities on every film directed by him dating back to Independence Day (1996), with the exception of the film The Patriot (2000).

Career
As a second unit cinematographer, Foerster worked on the films Alien Resurrection (1997), Ballistic: Ecks vs. Sever (2002), Johnson Family Vacation (2004), The Day After Tomorrow (2004), Æon Flux (2005) and 10,000 BC (2008), also working as a second unit director on the latter four films.

She was the cinematographer for the visual effects and/or miniature unit on Independence Day (1996), Godzilla (1998), Pitch Black (2000) and Stuart Little 2 (2002).

As a director, she directed five episodes of the television series Criminal Minds, an episode of its spin-off Criminal Minds: Suspect Behavior, three episodes of Unforgettable, and four episodes of the Starz series Outlander.

Foerster made her feature film directing debut with the action horror film Underworld: Blood Wars (2016).

In 2016, J. J. Abrams and his production company Bad Robot hired Foerster to direct Lou, a thriller about a mother trying to recover her abducted child.

Future project
In 2008, she was reported to be developing a film Secret Hunter based on the Ranulph Fiennes novel The Secret Hunters (2002).

Filmography as director
 Outlander (4 episodes, 2014–2015)
 Underworld: Blood Wars (2016)
 Westworld (2020) (Season 3, Episode 5: "Genre")
 Lou (2022)

References

External links
 
 

1971 births
Living people
American cinematographers
American film directors
American television directors
German women cinematographers
American women cinematographers
American women film directors
American women television directors
German emigrants to the United States
Visual effects artists
21st-century American women